Sara-Maude Boucher (born 10 March 1979) is a Canadian former alpine skier who competed in the 2002 Winter Olympics.

References

1979 births
Living people
Canadian female alpine skiers
Olympic alpine skiers of Canada
Alpine skiers at the 2002 Winter Olympics